Ricardo Michel Vázquez Guillén (born 15 May 1990) is a former Mexican professional footballer who last played as a forward for Leones Negros UdeG.

Club career

Guadalajara
Vázquez was one of the most promising young prospects for Club Deportivo Guadalajara. In his third game with Chivas, he scored a goal against Club Libertad in the 2010 Copa Libertadores.
 He scored his first league goal for Chivas against tecos estudiantesin the Apertura 2010 season in a 3–0 victory for chivas. He has become a regular on the first team as a starter and as a substitute. He was fired from the team for not playing to expectation.

Querétaro F.C.
Vázquez was loaned to Querétaro F.C. for the Apertura 2011 season. He scored his first goal with Querétaro against C.F. Pachuca.

Return To Guadalajara
Vázquez returned to Guadalajara on Loan from BUAP. Vázquez scored his first goal of the season on 9 August 2015 against Tigres. He scored his second against pachuca to make the game 2-1 for guadalajara the game ended in a 4–4 tie

U-23 International appearances
As of 2 September 2011

Honours
Guadalajara
Copa MX: Apertura 2015

References

External links
 at Guadalajara official website 

1990 births
Living people
Footballers from Guadalajara, Jalisco
Mexican footballers
Mexican expatriate footballers
Categoría Primera B players
C.D. Guadalajara footballers
Querétaro F.C. footballers
Tecos F.C. footballers
Lobos BUAP footballers
C.D. Veracruz footballers
Boyacá Chicó F.C. footballers
Expatriate footballers in Colombia
Association football forwards